Villamanín is a municipality located in the province of León, Castile and León, Spain. According to the 2004 census (INE), the municipality has a population of 1,161 inhabitants.

List of settlements included in the municipality
 Arbas del Puerto
 Barrio de la Tercia
 Busdongo de Arbas
 Camplongo de la Tercia
 Casares de Arbas
 Cubillas de Arbas
 Fontún de la Tercia
 Golpejar de la Tercia
 Millaro de la Tercia
 Pendilla de Arbas
 Poladura de la Tercia
 Rodiezmo de la Tercia
 San Martín de la Tercia
 Tonín de Arbas
 Velilla de la Tercia
 Ventosilla de la Tercia
 Viadangos de Arbas
 Villamanín de la Tercia
 Villanueva de la Tercia

References

Municipalities in the Province of León